θ Carinae, Latinized as Theta Carinae, is a spectroscopic binary star in the southern constellation of  Carina. With an apparent visual magnitude of 2.76, it is the brightest star in the open star cluster IC 2602. It marks the northeastern end of the Diamond Cross asterism.

Properties

The MKK stellar classification of this star is B0.5 Vp, which indicates this B-type main sequence star generates energy through the nuclear fusion of hydrogen in its core. The 'p' suffix designates peculiar spectral features, which have been observed in both optical and ultraviolet wavelengths.

Theta Carinae is a single-lined spectroscopic binary with a 2.2 day period; the shortest known orbital period among massive stars, suggesting earlier mass transfer between the two components, possibly explaining the spectral peculiarities. In this spectroscopic system, the primary star is probably a blue straggler, which is an unusual type of star created by merging or the interaction between two or more stars. The source of the mass transfer is likely to be the less massive secondary companion, and what is now is the primary star was probably originally the less massive component. The estimated age of the pair is 4 million years, and it appears much younger than the surrounding IC 2602 cluster.

The primary star is about 15 solar masses and five solar radii. Theta Carinae has an intensely hot outer radiating envelope with an effective surface temperature of 31,000 K. Once the primary reaches around 11 million years old, the star will expand and will begin to transferring its outer surface mass back to its companion. Little is known about the companion star, but it is likely an F-type star with a luminosity less than 1% of the primary.

Etymology

Apparent location
In most versions of its asterism, the neighbouring bright stars, thus plotted along the imaginary hull forming Carina are Omega Carinae which is approximately 120 light years closer and PP (also known as p) Carinae, of a similar distance to Theta.

References

External links
 Southern Sky Photos

B-type main-sequence stars
Blue stragglers
Carinae, Theta
Carina (constellation)
4199
093030
052419
Durchmusterung objects
IC 2602
Spectroscopic binaries